Manika, is a community development  blocks in Latehar district, in Indian state of Jharkhand. It is located around 131 km from Ranchi, the state capital.

Latehar district
Community development blocks in Jharkhand
Community development blocks in Latehar district
Cities and towns in Latehar district